There are several Australian motor racing teams which have been called Team Brock.
 Paul Weel Racing - Team Brock identity from 2003.
 Rod Nash Racing - Team Brock identity from 2002.
 Team Brock (1976) - Short lived Group C team from 1976/77.
 Team Brock (Procar) - Team run by James Brock in Nations Cup and V8 Utes.

See also
Peter Brock

Australian auto racing teams
Supercars Championship teams